Republic Services is an American waste disposal company whose services include non-hazardous solid waste collection, waste transfer, waste disposal, recycling, and energy services. It is the second largest provider of waste disposal in the United States (as measured by revenue) after Waste Management Corporation.

Company history
Republic Industries was created as a waste disposal firm in 1981. Wayne Huizenga became chairman of the board in 1995, when Republic Industries began acquiring auto dealerships and car rental agencies. In 1998, Republic Industries spun off Republic Services as an IPO, and then changed its name to AutoNation.

In June 2008, Republic became the second largest waste management company in the United States following the acquisition of its larger competitor, Allied Waste Industries, for $6.1 billion in Republic stock. The merged company retained the Republic Services name.

The Wall Street Journal reported in June 2010 that Republic Services’ $4 billion acquisition of Allied in December 2008  "has been successful from the start", delivering at the high end of the annual savings projected when they did the deal ($191 million), a 27 percent increase in share price.

After 12 years as CEO of Republic Services, James O’Connor retired on January 1, 2011, and was replaced by the president and COO of Republic Services, Don Slager. In May 2019, Jon Vander Ark took over as president. In 2021, Slager retired and Vander Ark was named CEO.

James P. Snee and Katharine Weymouth were appointed to the Republic Services Board of Directors in 2018, resulting in a total of 12 board members, 11 of them independent.

Based on an annual report published in 2018, with a revenue of $10 billion, the firm retained the number two position in the industry.

Operations
Republic Services’ operations primarily consist of providing collection, transfer, and disposal of non-hazardous solid waste, recovering and recycling of certain materials, and energy services.

As of December 31, 2017, it operated in 40 states and Puerto Rico through 343 collection operations, 204 transfer stations, 195 active landfills, 90 recycling centers, 7 treatment, recovery, and disposal facilities, and 11 salt water disposal wells. Republic also operated 68 landfill gas and renewable energy projects and had post-closure responsibility for 124 closed landfills.

In January 2016, Republic realigned its field support functions by combining its three regions into two field groups, consolidating its areas, and streamlining select operational support roles at its Phoenix headquarters.

Fleet
According to Fleet Owner 500, 2021, Republic Services ranked 5 in the U.S. with a total number of trucks in service of 16,000.

Renewable natural gas usage
Republic Services announced in May 2017 that it will increase its usage of renewable natural gas (RNG) by a factor of three above what it used in 2016. They will also reduce the usage of CO2e (carbon dioxide equivalent) by about 110,000 metric tons by their fleet over the coming three years with an expanded agreement with Clean Energy.

Fleet automation
Approximately 75% of its residential routes have been converted to automated single driver trucks. By converting its residential routes to automated service, they reduce labor costs, improve driver productivity, decrease emissions, and create a safer employee work environment. Additionally, communities using automated vehicles have higher participation rates in recycling programs, thereby complementing its initiative to expand its recycling capabilities.

Fleet conversion to compressed natural gas (CNG)

As of November 2016, Republic Services operated a fleet of almost 2,500 CNG-powered vehicles, supported by 38 natural gas fueling stations. According to the company, their CNG fleet helped to save about 21 million gallons of diesel fuel.

In August 2016 Republic Services opened a new Compressed Natural Gas (CNG) fueling station in Long Beach, California. The station will serve the recent addition of 56 CNG-powered garbage trucks, which replaced their old diesel trucks. With this addition of CNG trucks, the total number of alternative fuel vehicles operating in Long Beach is 147.

In Broward and Dade Counties in South Florida, Republic Services added 62 CNG trucks to their collection fleet in April 2016. The addition brought the total number of trucks to 127.

In Central Contra Costa County, Republic Services added 40 Compressed Natural Gas solid waste collection trucks to its fleet. The CNG trucks replaced diesel-powered garbage collection trucks. As of April 2016, the total number of CNG trucks operated by Republic in Contra Costa County was 123.

In Portland, Republic Services added 16 CNG solid waste collection trucks to its fleet in April 2016.

In St. Louis, the company added four CNG solid waste collection trucks to its fleet, bringing the total number of CNG trucks in the region to 107.

Approximately 19% of its fleet operates on CNG. During 2017 about 30% of the company's replacement vehicle purchases were CNG vehicles. As of December 31, 2017, they operated 37 CNG fueling stations.

In Raleigh, North Carolina, Republic Services added eight CNG trucks in November 2015, bringing the total number of CNG trucks in North Carolina to 25.

Republic Services brought the number of CNG trucks operating in Colorado up to 82 with an addition of 17 trucks in the greater Denver area.

Standardized vehicle maintenance 
In order to improve important aspects of vehicle safety, environmental impact, and vehicle service life, the company implemented standardized maintenance programs for 100% of its fleet as of December 31, 2017.

Landfills

Republic Services owns or operates 195 active landfills. They also have responsibility for 124 closed landfills, for which they have associated closure and post-closure obligations.

Republic Services owns and operates the largest landfill in the United States at 2,200 acres (890 ha) located in Apex, Nevada.

In 2008, at the time that Republic Services bought Allied Waste, it acquired two closed St. Louis, Missouri landfills, West Lake and Bridgeton. An underground event (more accurately referred to as a “smoldering event”)   was detected in the closed Bridgeton Landfill. Due to the odors emitted from the landfill and its proximity to the adjacent West Lake—an EPA-managed Super Fund site that contains low-level radioactive waste dumped there illegally over forty years ago—environmental groups got involved.

Republic operates the Bridgeton Landfill near St. Louis, Missouri. The landfill is the site of an underground event of concern to residents and the EPA.

Recycling centers 
Republic owns or operates 90 recycling centers that process over 6 million tons of recyclables annually. These facilities generate revenue through the processing and sale of old corrugated cardboard (OCC), old newspaper (ONP), aluminum, glass, and other materials, which accounted for approximately 5% of their revenue in 2017. Approximately 77% of its recycling center volume relates to OCC, ONP, and other mixed papers. Of the 5.0 million tons they sold during 2017, 2.5 million moved through its recycling centers, and 2.5 million they collected and delivered to third parties.

In June 2016 the company, together with Lab USA, announced the launch of a state-of-the-art ash metal recovery facility at the Roosevelt Regional Landfill in Roosevelt, Washington. The high-tech process allows metals that would otherwise have been lost into the environment to be reclaimed, recycled, shipped to manufacturers, and repurposed as new metal products. The facility systematically extracts metal from ash that is already found in the landfill, in addition to all newly delivered ash. The facility recovers and recycles more than 46,200 tons of ferrous metals and 42,900 tons of non-ferrous metals. According to the American Iron and Steel Institute, recycling iron uses 20 percent less energy in production than extracting iron from natural resources. Recycling copper saves about 60 percent of the energy which would be needed to mine copper. The use of this facility will help to reduce greenhouse gas emissions.

On Earth Day, April 22, 2016, Republic Services announced enhancements they made to the Anaheim Recycling Center. The new system can handle over 1000 tons of recyclables each day, or 100 tons per hour.

At the end of 2015, Republic Services opened a $35 million, 110,000 square-foot North Las Vegas Recycling Center, designed by local architect, Edward Vance of EV&A Architects. The plant's solar panels generate enough energy to run the plant for two to three months. The plant can process two million pounds of recycled paper each day, or 70 tons per hour. Eventually, the plant will be able to recycle three million pounds of paper per day. Optical sorters use 2D and 3D technologies to speed sorting.  Low-flow water fixtures in the building will reduce water consumption by 20%.

In early 2015 Republic Services invested $19 million in a St. Louis recycling center upgrade of the company's state-of-the-art Northside Recycling Center. The upgraded center is able to produce 25 tons of baled recycled material an hour. Ninety-two percent of the material that comes through the center is then sold to be remade into new products.

In April 2019 Republic Services opened a state-of-the-art recycling and waste disposal center in Plano, Texas, replacing the facility that had burned down in December 2016.

Regulation
Republic Services, along with all other waste and recycling companies, are subject to a variety of federal, state, and local requirements that regulate, among other things, the environment, public health, safety, zoning, and land use. Operating and other permits, licenses, and other approvals generally are required for landfills and transfer stations, certain solid waste collection vehicles, fuel storage tanks, and other facilities that they own or operate. Federal, state, and local laws and regulations vary, but generally govern wastewater or storm water discharges, air emissions, the handling, transportation, treatment, storage, and disposal of hazardous and non-hazardous waste, and the remediation of contamination associated with the release or threatened release of hazardous substances. These laws and regulations provide governmental authorities with strict powers of enforcement. The U.S. Environmental Protection Agency (EPA) and various other federal, state, and local authorities administer these regulations.

Customer service centers

In January 2016, the company said it will invest $20 million in 2016 to design and implement its Customer Resource Centers in addition to other customer focused initiatives. The company expects the changes to result in a yearly savings of about $10 million.

The plan calls for the consolidation of 108 regional customer centers into three main customer resource centers in Fishers, Indiana, Charlotte, North Carolina, and Chandler, Arizona.

In February 2016 it was announced by North Carolina Governor Pat McCrory and N.C. Commerce Secretary John E. Skvareta, III, that Republic Services was planning to open a full-service Customer Resource Center in Charlotte. It is expected that the facility will create over 350 new jobs, while Republic's investment in the center is projected to be over $6.8 million over the next three years.

In April 2017, Republic Services opened a customer service center in Fishers, Indiana, employing over 250 workers, with plans to hire an additional 120 during the year. The company invested $13.6 million to renovate and equip office space along the I-69 corporate corridor in Fishers. The customer service office is expected to create up to 469 new jobs by 2025.

Corporate responsibility, sustainability, and innovation

Republic Services puts a 45% of its earnings into developing new technologies and initiating new programs across the US. The company has also been an industry leader in advancing new technologies, including converting landfill gas to energy, solar energy products, and a natural gas fleet.

The company has developed programs that will enable it to reduce emissions by 2.5 million tons of carbon dioxide equivalent over the next four years, including developing at least two landfill gas-to-energy projects each year, adding at least 150,000 tons per year of recycling capacity, and reducing the greenhouse gas emissions from its fleet by 3% by 2018.

At the end of 2015, 40 companies participated in an inaugural business tour in Seattle highlighting the regenerative model of what has become known as the circular economy. Those in attendance, including Jennifer Gerholdt, the environment and sustainability director at the US Chamber of Commerce Foundation, toured Republic Services as well as General Biodiesel, Phillips, PCC Markets/Wiserg, and others.

Republic Services scored in the 90th percentile of the Commercial Services and Supplies sector of the 2016 Dow Jones Sustainability—North America Index™ (DJSI) and was also named to the 2016 DJSI World and North America indices. Republic is the only recycling and solid waste collection provider in the Commercial Services and Supplies sector that is included in the 2016 DJSI World Index. The rankings highlight Republic's leadership in corporate governance, environmental, social, and financial aspects of sustainability.

The Blue Planet sustainability initiative is Republic Services’ approach to corporate social responsibility through their efforts to reduce emissions from operations; improve materials management; improve safety standards; increase community engagement; and a focus on employee growth opportunities. At the end of August 2017, the company released its most recent Sustainability Report describing how well it was able to advance its sustainability initiatives.

In September 2019, the company became the first US solid waste and recycling provider whose emissions reduction targets were approved by the Science Based Targets Initiative. These goals meet the targets that the Paris Agreement requires.

In 2019 Republic Services was acknowledged by Barron's as one of the United States' 100 Most Sustainable Companies, for the second consecutive year.

The company was listed on Forbes as one of the country's best employers for women, the only Arizona-based company to do so.

Recycling
In partnership with the Alabama Coastal Foundation (ACF) Republic Services launched an oyster shell collection program in May 2017 with several coastal restaurants. Funded by a two-year grant from the National Fish and Wildlife Foundation, the goal of the collection program is to create sustainable oyster habitats and to teach the public about the importance of oyster shell recycling. In just over nine months the ACF collected 10.1 acres of shells, which were recycled back into the Gulf of Mexico, creating new habitats for baby oysters, shrimp, and crab.

In Missoula, Montana, Republic Services launched an expanded recycling program in response to a demand made by the citizens of the city.

On April 19, 2016, Republic Services launched a website to allow easier access to sustainability resources and community tours at the Southern Nevada Recycling Center. The Nevada Center opened in November 2015 and is described as a “state-of-the-art” recycling center. It was designed by Ed Vance & Associates and built by Cambridge Cos., of Griffith, Indiana.

In partnership with the city of Chesterfield, and USAgain, Republic Services launched a new program offering curbside textile recycling in Chesterfield, Missouri. The program began in April 2016.

In September 2015 the Buffalo Bills partnered with Republic Services for the third year in a row to encourage and support recycling during the football team's home games. The goal was to maintain the cleanliness of the parking lot at Ralph Wilson Stadium by handing out recycling bags and garbage bags to fans who participate in tailgating.

The University of Nevada, Las Vegas partnered with Republic Services of Southern Nevada in September 2015 to participate in the GameDay Recycling Challenge. The challenge is a competition between 72 college football teams across the United States.

At the end of August 2017, Republic Services signed a deal to purchase ReCommunity Holdings, the largest independent recycling-processing company in the United States. ReCommunity operates 26 recycling centers in 14 states, manufacturing reusable items from waste. ReCommunity's plants recover about 1.6 million tons of recyclable commodities annually, which will help Republic Services achieve their "Blue Planet" sustainable initiative of adding at least 150,000 tons of recycling capacity per year by 2018.

The company implements a Recycling Simplified Education Program which includes K-12 lesson plans, a website that explains what can and cannot be recycled, and other information to help educate the public about recycling. The program won the 2019 Best Recycling Public Education Program Award.

Solar energy
In 2017 the company invested $29 million in solar projects at some of its landfills and other locations. Republic Services has either built, invested in, or operates over 236,000 solar panels at 19 generating facilities in the US, with a total capacity of 80 megawatts, enough electricity to power 208,000 homes.

In September 2017, Republic Services and Soltage activated a 13.5 megawatt solar energy project in Massachusetts. When finished, the project, constructed on three former landfill sites, will include approximately 41,000 solar panels to power 1,900 local households and reduce carbon emissions by more than 14,000 tons.

In 2018 the company, in partnership with New Jersey Resources, launched a 40,000 solar panel project in South Brunswick. Built on an old landfill, the site can generate 13 MW of electricity, enough to power 1,360 homes each year. It will reduce CO2 emissions by 14,000 tons, equal to taking 2,700 cars off the road every year, according to the EPA.

Composting
In April 2016 the city of Boise, Idaho considered the implementation of a composting program, utilizing Republic Services, the company that was already hauling garbage in the city. The program went into effect in June 2017. After a little more than one month, the company picked up 1,716 tons of compost from Boise's single-family homes.

On May 6, 2010, Allied Waste, a Republic Services company, upgraded its Pacific Region Compost Facility (PRC) with the state's first food composting facility.  The facility accepts all food waste including meat, bread, and vegetable products, which per the Oregon Department of Environmental Quality (DEQ) is almost 15 percent of the material landfilled in Oregon. Allied Waste paved 2 acres (8,100 m2) and purchased and installed a composting system that has been used successfully in Washington and California called “aerated static pile technology.” It captures and controls emissions from the composting process using a negative air system. It has a smaller footprint than other methods and reduces the amount of storm water runoff.

Landfill gas to energy (LFGTE)

The Pinehill Landfill in Longview, Texas will generate 404 million cubic feet of renewable natural gas per year, taking the place of over 19 million gallons of gas annually, with a concomitant reduction in carbon emissions.

In July 2016 Republic Services and Mas Energy launched a new renewable energy project to serve the metropolitan Atlanta area. The project includes three landfill gas-to-energy facilities in Buford, Griffin, and Winder. The facilities will produce 24.1 megawatts of electricity, enough to power 15,665 households.  The three facilities together will be the largest landfill gas-to-energy project in Georgia. 
Republic Services converts landfill gas, the natural byproduct of decomposing waste, to energy. The use of landfill gas is beneficial to the U.S. economy by reducing air pollution through the capture and use of methane. As of July 2016, Republic Services operated 69 landfill gas and renewable energy projects.

In April 2015 Republic Services opened a landfill gas-to-energy project near Los Angeles at the Sunshine Canyon Landfill. The 20-megawatt renewable energy project can supply enough electricity to power almost 25,000 homes in the area.

In January 2010, the EPA's Landfill Methane Outreach Program (LMOP) selected three Republic Services landfill gas-to-energy projects (LFGTE) as LFGTE Projects of the Year for 2009. Ox Mountain Landfill in Half Moon Bay, California; Jefferson City Landfill in Jefferson City, Missouri and Oak Grove Landfill in Winder, Georgia were honored at the annual LMOP conference in Baltimore in January 2010.

Republic Services developed LFGTE projects at 73 of its 213 landfills, including 52 electric generating plants, 13 medium Btu plants that provide LFG to industrial users, 6 high Btu plants that produce pipeline quality gas, and 3 leachate evaporators; The 52 electric projects generate 323 MW of electricity, enough to power about 250,000 homes. The 22 other projects provide or process more than 58,000 scfm of gas, the energy needed to heat almost 200,000 homes, the combined benefits equivalent to removing about 4 million cars off the road.

In 2008, Republic Services agreed to pay a $1 million fine and up to $36 million in remediation costs for alleged violations of the Clean Water Act at a closed landfill in Clark County, Nevada.

In 2007, Republic Services was fined $725,000 by the State of California related to hazardous waste leaking from a closed landfill into San Francisco Bay.

Charitable giving 
In August 2018, Republic Services launched its first company wide charitable giving program: National Neighborhood Promise.

Lobbying
In 2014, Republic Services gave $50,000 to Missouri Republicans to their House and Senate campaign committees and $20,000 to House and Senate committees for Missouri Democrats.

Criticism and controversy

West Lake Landfill (Missouri) 
Republic Services is identified by the EPA as one of four potentially responsible parties for the EPA Superfund cleanup site West Lake Landfill in Bridgeton, Missouri. Its contents have been shown to include radioactive waste and it was featured in the 2017 HBO documentary Atomic Homefront.

In 2013 the company said it would build a barrier to separate the section with a subsurface smoldering fire from the section with radioactive waste, but because the EPA was uncertain where the radioactive contamination was located, progress on the barrier was delayed for more than a year. In response to criticism that the EPA was not moving quickly enough to clean up West Lake Landfill, Republic Services spent between $10,000 and $100,000 on advertising in 2015, according to spokesman Russ Knocke. This included employing representatives to criticize community activists on social media.

In March 2016 the EPA released studies that showed the extent of the radioactive waste on the site and allowed the company to build a barrier without disturbing the radioactive areas. During the construction of the barrier, Republic also must submit plans for a cooling system, which must be completed within four months of commencement of construction. The company will also enlarge onto the north quarry of Bridgeton Landfill a plastic liner that it already installed over the south quarry. Environmental Protection Agency Region 7 Administrator Mark Hague said this should help control the reaction by blocking oxygen “as well as mitigate some of the odors coming off of this site.” Republic will also install more temperature monitors plus two sulfur dioxide monitors to track unhealthy emissions. They will also be required to develop a system that can quickly extinguish any new hot spots that the underground event might create.

Hurtado et al v. Rainbow Environmental Services and Republic Services (California) 
In September 2017, former and current employees of Republic Services at the former Rainbow Environmental Services waste transfer station in Huntington Beach, California, filed a legal complaint pursuant to the Employee Retirement Income Security Act of 1974, regarding the illegal sale of the former employee-owned company to Republic Services in 2014. The lawsuit alleged a series of "bad-faith dealings made by the executive leadership of Rainbow, through which they funded the creation of new companies and otherwise redirected ESOP assets. Apart from allegedly violating the plan document, these investments caused losses to the Rainbow ESOP while benefiting the executives, according to plaintiffs." In the decision, there is a section that describes the alleged role played by a fake attorney who, according to the plaintiffs, was a Republic Services corporate manager who attempted to intimidate or misdirect potential plaintiffs.  The plaintiffs, representing 400-plus former and current employees, agreed in May 2021 to a $7.9 million settlement.

National Treasure Historic Wintersburg (California) 
In October 2014, Republic Services purchased Rainbow Environmental Services in Huntington Beach, California. The purchase included a National Treasure Historic Place representing 100-plus years of Japanese American history known as Historic Wintersburg. The property previously was listed as one of "America's 11 Most Endangered Historic Places" in 2014 and designated a "National Treasure" in 2015 by the National Trust for Historic Preservation. It was listed in 2017 as one of Orange County's Most Endangered Historic Places by Preserve Orange County.

The Ocean View School District, a public elementary school district in Huntington Beach, California, blocked changes by Republic Services to the Historic Wintersburg property in a 2013 legal complaint regarding the waste transfer station's impacts on the Oak View Preschool and Oak View Elementary School.  A legal settlement in 2016 included a provision that Republic Services “will not use the adjacent ‘Historic Wintersburg’ property to expand any of their operations." Republic Services made public statements they would not demolish the property's six historic structures and would participate in discussions regarding the purchase and preservation of Historic Wintersburg as a heritage park.

In February 2018, Republic unexpectedly disclosed its intent to sell Historic Wintersburg for development as a self-storage facility. Historical and civil rights organizations protested, including the City of Huntington Beach Historic Resources Board, Preserve Orange County, California Preservation Foundation, the Japanese American National Museum, and the national Japanese American Citizens League. As of 2022, Republic Services continues to own the endangered historic property. On February 25, 2022, two of the oldest structures on the property, the 1910 Wintersburg Japanese Mission and 1910 manse (parsonage), were lost to fire and demolition.

References

External links

 Republic Services

 Sustainability

Companies listed on the New York Stock Exchange
Waste management companies of the United States
Companies based in Phoenix, Arizona
American companies established in 1998
1998 initial public offerings